Elmonica is an unincorporated community in Washington County, Oregon, United States. The community is named for a station on the old Oregon Electric Railway, derived from the names of the daughters of an owner of land along the route.

Samuel B. Stoy, a Portland insurance executive, owned property along the proposed OE line and only gave permission for the railroad to go through his property if the company agreed to name the station after his daughters, Eleanor and Monica. After the station was named Elmonica, this then led to the area around the station becoming known as Elmonica as well.

References

Unincorporated communities in Washington County, Oregon
Unincorporated communities in Oregon